Adamir Jerković (born 22 February 1958) is a Bosnian politician, journalist and publicist, expert in the fields of state governance and administration, public relations and archival profession.

He was consultant for the first President of Bosnia and Herzegovina Alija Izetbegović and has written several books on the time spent consulting him.

Biography
Jerković was born 22 February 1958 in Zenica, SR Bosnia and Herzegovina, SFR Yugoslavia, as the firstborn son of Hasan and Sevleta Jerković. After completing primary school "Rade Kondić" in Nemila, he enrolled in the Grammar School "29 November" in Zenica, which he graduated from in 1972. He earned his bachelor's degree at the Faculty of Law in Sarajevo. He completed his MA degree in History in sociological sciences at the Faculty of Philosophy in Sarajevo and PHD of science at International University in Novi Pazar.

Jerković was involved in journalism since his student days. He started his career in Zenica-based newspaper "Our Word" in 1976 for which he wrote a feuilleton entitled "Towards Colombo", dealing with participating countries at the 5th Summit of the Non-Aligned Movement held from on 16 to 19 August 1976 in Colombo, Sri Lanka. He started working at Radio Zenica in 1977, going through all professional stages, from being a reporter to editor-in-chief. In 1989, he became the Secretary of the Presidency of the OK SSRNJ Zenica (Socialist Alliance of the Working People of Yugoslavia) and he held this post when he ran for the Mayor of the Zenica Municipality. Following the decision to organize multi-party elections in 1990, he participated as the list leader of the DSS – Democratic Socialist Alliance (successor to the Republican Conference of the Socialist Alliance of Working People of Bosnia and Herzegovina). He was elected member of the Council of the Municipality of Zenica, but he resigned soon afterwards. He worked as a journalist for many years- he was a correspondent of RTV Sarajevo, and, during the aggression on Bosnia and Herzegovina, the editor-in-chief of Zenica Region TV – ITC RTV BiH. He authored numerous analytical articles and editorials for the local and foreign media. He actively worked on breaking the media blockade in which he eventually succeeded. He edited the famous and popular political show "Meetings of the Worlds" which was broadcast weekly by Radio Zenica. In addition to analyses of events, the show used its foreign correspondents to monitor developments related to Bosnia and Herzegovina in the global centers of political power. After the war, he started working for the foreign news desk of the TVBiH, publishing opinion pieces and analyses which were well received by the public in Bosnia and Herzegovina and the region.

Advisor to President Alija Izetbegović
In 1997, the Chairman of the Presidency of Bosnia and Herzegovina Alija Izetbegović appointed Jerković the Advisor in his cabinet. After that, he underwent PR professional training at the State Department in Washington. He was a member of the government delegation during bilateral meetings with heads of state, prime ministers and world leaders, as well as at international conferences dedicated to Bosnia and Herzegovina, from various donor conferences to the Stability Pact for South Eastern Europe conference of 30 July 1999. At the time of need for strengthening the Bosnian institutions and as a person with an international PR certificate, he was appointed the first spokesman of the Presidency of Bosnia and Herzegovina. He headed the delegations in the country and abroad. He was a personal and special envoy of the Chairman of the Presidency of Bosnia and Herzegovina Alija Izetbegović with several heads of state.

He is the first Bosnian-Herzegovinian official who visited the People's Republic of China in September 2000. As a Special Envoy of the Chairman of the BiH Presidency, Alija Izetbegović, he carried a message for the leader of the People's Republic of China and General Secretary of the Central Committee of the Communist Party of China, Jiang Zemin. During the visit to China, his hosts were the Vice Premier of the State Council and member of the Politburo of the Communist Party of China Qian Qichen and Assistant Foreign Minister Liu Guchang. He conveyed a joint message of the state leadership of Bosnia and Herzegovina about unified China, whose integral part is Taiwan. The Chinese promised to triple their aid to Bosnia and Herzegovina, which they did. Shortly after that, the PRC invested substantial funds in the construction of infrastructure facilities and provision of aid to refugees, and an improvement was made in the BiH – Chinese relations in this period.

After the withdrawal of the President Alija Izetbegović from active politics on 14 October 2000, he remained an Advisor to the new Member of the BiH Presidency, Halid Genjac. Under the decision of the representatives of the international community in Bosnia and Herzegovina, Halid Genjac was to remain a Member of the BiH presidency only until 30 March 2001. when Beriz Belkić of the Party for Bosnia and Herzegovina was to replace him. He remained an advisor to Belkić as well, after which he was appointed the chief of staff of the Member of the BiH Presidency. He kept his post at the Presidency of Bosnia and Herzegovina until 31 January 2002. Subsequently, he participated in international conferences dedicated to the life and work of the first President of Bosnia and Herzegovina, which, following the passing of Alija Izetbegović, are regularly organized in Turkey and he participated in similar conferences in Cairo and Priština and at the IUS University of Sarajevo.

Under the Decision of the Government of the Federation of Bosnia and Herzegovina of 24 March 2000 24 March 2000, he was appointed the President of the Board of the Poštanska Banka BiH / Postbank BiH and held this post for two years with outstanding results. During his term of office, he managed to open branches in Sarajevo and Živinice. During this period, Postbank was 100% state-owned and it recorded good financial results After the end of his term at the Presidency of BiH, he was chosen to participate in the first management of a new enterprise – Public Utility BH Pošta, at which he served as Assistant general manager. After this, he held the post of the advisor for legal and economic affairs to the Federal Minister of Labor and Social Policy from 2003 to 2007.

Reformer of the Archives of the Federation of BiH

On 26 April 2007 he was appointed the Director of the Archives of the Federation of Bosnia and Herzegovina. There, he found severely dysfunctional working relations, but soon enough he managed to establish good working atmosphere and remarkable work and technological discipline. He opened the Archives of the Federation of Bosnia and Herzegovina to the world and established institutional links with many archives in the world. He organized international exhibition on the Srebrenica Genocide in about thirty world capitals in Europe, Asia and Africa.

During the protests in Sarajevo and arson which took place in the Presidency of Bosnia and Herzegovina on 7 February 2014, complete documentation and entire fonds of the Archives of the Federation of Bosnia and Herzegovina were saved thanks to his consistent work on ensuring adequate anti-fire and anti-burglary protection.

He has been the president of the Commission for Taking Archival Professional Exam in the FBiH since 2007
, and from 2009 onwards he has been the chairman of the board of the Association of Archival and Administrative Workers of the Federation of Bosnia and Herzegovina, one of two professional association of archivists.

Today, he is a professor at the International University in Novi Pazar.

Published works

 Book Alija Upclose (in Bosnian:). The book was published in three tomes and has received a lot of publicity. Its promotion was attended by thousands of visitors. This trilogy had 55 promotions throughout Bosnia and Herzegovina, Slovenia, Croatia, Kosovo and Turkey. These books are found in numerous international libraries, in Prague, Cairo, Warsaw, Istanbul, Zagreb, Rijeka, Zadar, Maribor and other cities.
 Book Remembering Alija Izetbegovića (in Bosnian:) was published on the occasion of the 85th anniversary of the birth of Alija Izetbegovic. The author discussed the first President of Bosnia and Herzegovina with the presidents of state, prime ministers and prominent citizens of the world. These books are found in many cities of the world such as: Vilnius, Chisinau, Tallinn, Riga, Tbilisi, Istanbul, Adana and others. Publisher: Almada, Sarajevo, 2010.
 Co-author Of book "Bosnia, here and now". The book was presented to the heads of state and the participants of the international conference of the Stability Pact for South Eastern Europe which was held on 30 July 1999.
 Editor-in-chief of the book "Annals of the Archives of the Federation of Bosnia and Herzegovina", which has been published annually and it is in eight editions so far.

Honours, decorations, awards and distinctions
Jerković received multiple awards for his journalist work and won the first prize of the Association of Journalists of Bosnia and Herzegovina from Zenica "Golden Pen" on two occasions (in 1981 and 1983), as well as Silver Plaque "Metalurg" (in 1983).

He also received the most important archival recognition awarded by the Archives of the Federation of BiH, "King Tvrtko the First Kotromanić Plaque", for the international presentation of Bosnia and Herzegovina, general contribution to the archives as well as the stabilization of the Archives of the Federation of BiH. This award was established in 2016 as a recognition which encompasses all of Bosnia and Herzegovina.

Other
Jerković has been a member of the Managing Board of the Institute for Research of Genocide from Canada since 2010

He is fluent in English and German.

See also

Alija Izetbegović
Archives of the Federation of Bosnia and Herzegovina

References/Notes and references

External links

1958 births
Living people
Bosniak politicians
Bosnia and Herzegovina politicians